Leše is a village in the Municipality of Tržič in the Upper Carniola region of Slovenia.

Name
Leše was attested in written sources in 1040 as silva que Leschahc nuncupator (and as predium Lêscah in 1050–63, and Loschach and Leschach in 1498). The name is derived from the plural demonym Lěščane, derived from the word lěska 'hazel'. The name thus originally means 'people living by the hazel grove'.

History
During the Second World War, the school in Leše was burned by the Partisans in 1944. A new school was built after the war.

Church
The local church is dedicated to Saint James. It dates from 1822 and contains paintings by Matija Bradaška (1852–1915).

Notable people
Notable people that were born or lived in Leše, or with ancestry from Leše, include:
 Josip Valjavec (1897–1959), lexicographer and religious writer
 Sunita Williams, American astronaut

References

External links

Leše at Geopedia

Populated places in the Municipality of Tržič